Saint-Paul-d'Abbotsford is a municipality in the Canadian province of Quebec, located within the Rouville Regional County Municipality in the province's Montérégie region. The population as of the 2011 Canadian Census was 2,870.

Demographics

Population
Population trend:

Language
Mother tongue language (2006)

See also
List of municipalities in Quebec

References

Incorporated places in Rouville Regional County Municipality
Municipalities in Quebec